Zan (also Romanized as Zān) is a village in Jamabrud Rural District, in the Central District of Damavand County, Tehran Province, Iran. At the 2006 census, its population was 396, in 130 families.

References 

Populated places in Damavand County